Dilraj Kaur (born 21 May 1960), is an Indian playback singer. She is most known for singing in films such as Galiyon Ka Badshah (2001), Me and Mr. Canadian (2019) etc. She has sung 286 songs in Hindi films.

Career
Dilraj Kaur started to play the tabla and taking musical training at the age of seven. Her first movie was in the 1975 film Jaan Hazir Hai.

In 1980, she released the song "Gaddi Jaangi Ye" along with singers Mohammed Rafi, Shailendra Singh and Hemlata composed by Usha Khanna which became a hit. Her most famous song was "Mausam Mastana", a duet with Asha Bhosle, from the 1982 film Satte Pe Satta starring Amitabh Bachchan. This song has been recreated by Indian Idol Junior contestant Ananya Sritam Nanda in 2016.

She went on to sing "Mausam Mastana" for the 1982 film Satte Pe Satta. She has sung under the baton of all top music directors including R. D. Burman, Laxmikant–Pyarelal, Kalyanji–Anandji, Bappi Lahiri, Usha Khanna, and Ravindra Jain.

References

External links

1960s births
Living people
Singers from Mumbai
Bollywood playback singers
Indian women singers
Indian women playback singers
Marathi-language singers
20th-century Indian women singers
20th-century Indian singers
21st-century Indian women singers
21st-century Indian singers
Indian Sikhs